The diamond killifish (Fundulus xenicus) is a species of North American killifish found in salt marshes, hypersaline flats and mangrove along the Gulf Coast of the United States. It is found in the aquarium trade. It was previously recognized as, Adinia xenica, the only known member of its genus. Nucleotide analyses has reevaluated the phylogeny of the Funduliidae and placed the diamond killifish into the Fundulus genus.

References

diamond killifish
Fauna of the Southeastern United States
Fish of the Gulf of Mexico
diamond killifish
diamond killifish
diamond killifish